Ganjar Mukti Muhardiyana (born 12 June 1994) is an Indonesian professional footballer who plays as a defender for Liga 2 club PSCS Cilacap, on loan from Liga 1 club PSM Makassar. He previously played for PS Bengkulu, Persita Tangerang, Bali United, PS TIRA, and PSIS Semarang.

Club career

PS Bengkulu
Ganjar joined PS Bengkulu in Divisi Utama 2013

Persita Tangerang
Ganjar joined Persita Tangerang, and made his debut in the 2014 Inter Island Cup.

Bali United
Move from Persita Tangerang and now he joined Bali United F.C. as a defender.

PS TNI
In 2016, he moved to PS TNI from Bali United with a reason to pursue his dream as Indonesian National Armed Forces.

PSIS Semarang
In September 2016, Ganjar joined PSIS Semarang.  He made his debut against Persekap Pasuruan which ended 3-1 for PSIS Semarang. Ganjar provide feedback led to goals who scored by Johan Yoga.

Arema
He was signed for Arema to play in Liga 1 in the 2020 season.

Persiraja Banda Aceh (loan)
He was signed for Persiraja Banda Aceh to play in the 2020 Liga 1, on loan from Arema. This season was suspended on 27 March 2020 due to the COVID-19 pandemic. The season was abandoned and was declared void on 20 January 2021.

Persis Solo
In 2021, Ganjar Mukti signed a contract with Indonesian Liga 2 club Persis Solo. He made his first 2021–22 Liga 2 debut on 18 October 2021, coming on as a starting in a 2–0 win with Hizbul Wathan at the Manahan Stadium, Surakarta.

PSM Makassar (loan)
In 2022, Ganjar Mukti signed a contract with Indonesian Liga 1 club PSM Makassar, on loan from Persis Solo. He made his league debut on 8 January 2022 in a match against Madura United at the Ngurah Rai Stadium, Denpasar.

Honours

Club
Persis Solo
 Liga 2: 2021

References

External links
 Ganjar Mukti at Soccerway
 Ganjar Mukti at Liga Indonesia

1994 births
Living people
People from Tangerang
Indonesian footballers
Sportspeople from Banten
Persita Tangerang players
Bali United F.C. players
PS TIRA players
PSIS Semarang players
Arema F.C. players
Persiraja Banda Aceh players
Persis Solo players
PSM Makassar players
PSCS Cilacap players
Indonesian Premier Division players
Liga 1 (Indonesia) players
Liga 2 (Indonesia) players
Association football defenders